Woolgar is a surname. Notable people with the surname include:

Fenella Woolgar (born 1969), English actress
Jack Woolgar (1913–1978), British actor
Matthew Woolgar (born 1976), English footballer
Sarah Woolgar (1824–1909), English actress
Steve Woolgar (born 1950), British sociologist
Tim Woolgar, British chess boxer